A list of films produced by the Marathi language film industry based in Maharashtra in the year 1967.

1967 Releases
A list of Marathi films released in 1967.

References

Lists of 1967 films by country or language
 Marathi
1967